The 1967–68 St. Louis Hawks season was the 13th and last season in city St. Louis for the franchise, before relocating to Atlanta for the following season.  The Hawks won the Western Division title with a record of 56–26, before losing to the San Francisco Warriors in the West Semifinal, four games to two.

Draft picks

Regular season

Season standings

Record vs. opponents

Game log

Player stats
Note: GP= Games played; MIN = Minutes; FG = Field goals; REB= Rebounds; AST= Assists; PTS = Points; AVG = Average

Season

Playoffs

|- align="center" bgcolor="#ffcccc"
| 1
| March 22
| San Francisco
| L 106–111
| Don Ohl (26)
| Paul Silas (15)
| Lenny Wilkens (9)
| Kiel Auditorium5,018
| 0–1
|- align="center" bgcolor="#ccffcc"
| 2
| March 23
| San Francisco
| W 111–103
| Zelmo Beaty (46)
| Zelmo Beaty (22)
| Lenny Wilkens (11)
| Kiel Auditorium5,810
| 1–1
|- align="center" bgcolor="#ffcccc"
| 3
| March 26
| @ San Francisco
| L 109–124
| three players tied (21)
| Zelmo Beaty (16)
| Lenny Wilkens (5)
| Cow Palace5,136
| 1–2
|- align="center" bgcolor="#ffcccc"
| 4
| March 29
| @ San Francisco
| L 107–108
| Zelmo Beaty (21)
| Bill Bridges (14)
| Lenny Wilkens (6)
| Oakland–Alameda County Coliseum Arena12,325
| 1–3
|- align="center" bgcolor="#ccffcc"
| 5
| March 31
| San Francisco
| W 129–103
| Bill Bridges (28)
| Lou Hudson (14)
| Lenny Wilkens (10)
| Kiel Auditorium4,118
| 2–3
|- align="center" bgcolor="#ffcccc"
| 6
| April 2
| @ San Francisco
| L 106–111
| Lou Hudson (35)
| Paul Silas (14)
| Lenny Wilkens (6)
| Cow Palace12,905
| 2–4
|-

Awards and records
Richie Guerin, NBA Coach of the Year Award
Lou Hudson, NBA All-Rookie Team 1st Team

References

Atlanta Hawks seasons
St. Louis
St. Louis Hawks
St. Louis Hawks